Riccardo Moretti (born 18 January 1985) is an Italian motorcycle racer. He won the Italian Honda RS125GP Trophy in 2007 and the Italian CIV 125 championship in 2009.

Career statistics

Grand Prix motorcycle racing

By season

Races by year
(key) (Races in bold indicate pole position, races in italics indicate fastest lap)

References

External links

Italian motorcycle racers
Living people
People from Lugo, Emilia-Romagna
125cc World Championship riders
Moto3 World Championship riders
1985 births
Sportspeople from the Province of Ravenna